Lai Tau Shek is a village in the North District, in the northwestern New Territories of Hong Kong.

Administration
Lai Tau Shek is a recognized village under the New Territories Small House Policy.

History
The village houses were abandoned in mid-1970s. Today, Lai Tau Shek Village is hidden in a dense forest and only tumbled building blocks remain.

See also
 Lai Chi Wo

References

External links

 Delineation of area of existing village Lai Tau Shek (Sha Tau Kok) for election of resident representative (2019 to 2022)

Villages in North District, Hong Kong